Ochthebius lineatus is a species of minute moss beetle in the family Hydraenidae. It is found in Central America, North America, and South America.

References

Further reading

 
 

Staphylinoidea
Articles created by Qbugbot
Beetles described in 1852